Kazakovo is a rural locality (a village) in Kargopolsky District, Arkhangelsk Oblast, Russia. The population was 391 as of 2010. There are 10 streets.

Geography 
Kazakovo is located 11 km east of Kargopol (the district's administrative centre) by road. Kuzino is the nearest rural locality.

References 

Rural localities in Kargopolsky District